Wepener is a surname. Notable people with the surname include:

Louw Wepener (1812–1865), South African commandant
Willie Wepener (born 1981), South African rugby union player